Frank Pearson (September 10, 1919 – August 11, 1997), nicknamed "Wahoo", was an American Negro league pitcher in the 1940s.

A native of Memphis, Tennessee, Pearson made his Negro leagues debut in 1945 for the Memphis Red Sox. He played with Memphis through the 1947 season, then joined the New York Black Yankees in 1948. Pearson died in Memphis in 1997 at age 77.

References

External links
 and Seamheads
 Frank 'Wahoo' Pearson at Negro League Baseball Players Association

1919 births
1997 deaths
Memphis Red Sox players
New York Black Yankees players
Baseball pitchers
Baseball players from Memphis, Tennessee
20th-century African-American sportspeople